HOPE (Hochleistungs-Penetrator = High Performance Penetrator) and HOSBO (Hochleistungs-spreng-bombe = High Performance Explosive Bomb) are a family of precision-guided munitions, currently under development by Diehl Defence for the German Luftwaffe. Diehl BGT was expected to reach production readiness in 2010, although neither the weapon nor the integration has been ordered so far.
German officials have announced that HOPE has greater penetration capability than a USAF GBU-28 munition.

A first test flight with HOPE, carried by a Tornado of the German Air Force, took place on 09-04-2008 in Manching, Germany.

A further successful test of the HOPE munition was carried out at the Swedish test range at Vidsel on 14 September 2008.

HOPE 
HOPE is a glide bomb with high maneuverability, developed particularly to engage hardened targets, such as tunnels or subterranean bunkers, but also moving targets.

HOSBO 
HOSBO is a highly maneuverable glide bomb that can be equipped with modular warheads, including non-lethal ones, e.g. with high-energy microwaves. Range and guidance are equal to HOPE.

Specifications 
Name: HOPE/HOSBO
Developer: Diehl BGT Defence
Range: 
Length: HOPE: ; HOSBO: 
Weight: HOPE: ; HOSBO: 
Diameter: approx. 
Guidance: GPS/INS and electro-optical video feedback

Platforms 
Eurofighter Typhoon
Panavia Tornado

See also 
 Taurus missile
 AGM-154 Joint Standoff Weapon
SOM (missile)

Post–Cold War weapons of Germany
Guided bombs
Aerial bombs of Germany